Borders Group, Inc. (former NYSE ticker symbol BGP) was an American multinational book and music retailer based in Ann Arbor, Michigan, United States. In its final year, the company employed about 19,500 people throughout the U.S., primarily in its Borders and Waldenbooks stores.

At the beginning of 2010, the company operated 511 Borders superstores in the United States. The company also operated 175 stores in the Waldenbooks Specialty Retail segment, including Waldenbooks, Borders Express, Borders airport stores, and Borders Outlet stores. In February 2011, Borders applied for Chapter 11 bankruptcy protection and began liquidating 226 of its stores in the United States. Despite a purchase offer from the private equity firm Najafi Companies, Borders was not able to find a buyer acceptable to its creditors before its July bidding deadline, so it began liquidating its remaining 399 retail outlets, with the last remaining stores closing in September. The Chapter 11 case was ultimately converted to Chapter 7. Rival bookseller Barnes & Noble acquired Borders' trademarks and customer list.

By the end of December 2009, Borders employed an estimated 1,150 staff across its UK stores, which went into bankruptcy administration before the end of 2009. All stores were closed by December 31, 2009. Borders Group also formerly operated stores in Australia, New Zealand, and Singapore. However, these were sold off to Pacific Equity Partners (which owned rival Angus & Robertson) in 2008, then were later sold again to REDgroup Retail. The stores continued to operate under the Borders brand as the unaffiliated "Borders Asia Pacific" until RedGroup was placed into voluntary administration in February 2011; with the five New Zealand stores sold to the James Pascoe Group and the Australian stores gradually shut down, with the last group closing in July 2011.

History

The original Borders bookstore was located in Ann Arbor, Michigan, United States, where it was founded in 1971 by brothers Tom and Louis Borders during their undergraduate and graduate years at the University of Michigan. The first Borders bookshop opened at 209 South State Street, Ann Arbor in 1971.

In 1975, they bought out the stock of Wahr's, an 80-year-old bookstore that was ending business at 316 South State Street, and hired Michael Hildebrand and Harvey James Robin to stock it with rare books and manage the old shop. Hildebrand had managed Gibson's used and rare book department in East Lansing for years and Harvey Robin had been a local restorer of rare books, who moved his bindery upstairs. Wahr's had been mainly a textbook and school supplies vendor, but the brothers did not deal in textbooks. They moved the retail bookshop to much larger quarters that had become available down the street at 303 South State, in the former location of the Wagner and Son men's clothing store. The old shop was renamed Charing Cross Bookshop and Tom Frick was sent over from the new bookshop to help.

In 1985, the company opened its second location, in Beverly Hills, Michigan.

The downtown Ann Arbor store moved across the street again in 1994 to 612 East Liberty Street, at the southwest corner of Liberty and State Streets, in the building once occupied by the defunct Jacobson's Department Store. Although not the original location, it was identified as "Borders #1" because it was the flagship store.

Former Hickory Farms president Robert F. DiRomualdo was hired in 1989 to expand the company.

Kmart and Waldenbooks
Borders was acquired in 1992 by Kmart, which had acquired mall-based book chain Waldenbooks eight years earlier. Kmart had struggled with the book division, having first tinkered with the assortment and later with discounting. In the Borders acquisition, Kmart merged the two companies in hopes that the experienced Borders senior management could bail out floundering Waldenbooks. Instead, many of the Borders senior management team left the company, leaving behind an even larger and more unwieldy division for Kmart executives to handle on the heels of aggressive expansions by rivals Barnes & Noble and Crown Books. Facing its own fiscal problems and intense pressure from stockholders, Kmart spun off Borders in 1995, in a highly structured stock-purchase plan. The newly formed company was initially called Borders-Walden Group and, by the end of the same year, renamed simply Borders Group.

In 1994, Borders briefly operated a mall-based toy store called All Wound Up, which sold toys and novelty items. Most All Wound Up stores were seasonal kiosks in shopping malls.

International expansion

Borders was rumoured to open stores in Canada, starting with a  retail store in Toronto. However, this was rejected for failing to meet Canadian ownership regulations for book retailers.

In 1997, the company established its first international store in Singapore, occupying  in Wheelock Place, Orchard Road, which was then the largest bookstore there. It subsequently opened another 41 stores in Australia, Ireland, New Zealand, and the United Kingdom and bought 35 Books etc. stores throughout Britain from Philip and Richard Joseph.

In 1998, Borders (UK) Ltd. was established as a Borders Group subsidiary and with its Borders and Books etc. After quickly becoming one of the country's leading booksellers, due to the fierce competition in the UK marketplace, a number of the Books etc. stores closed, and Borders (UK) Ltd. was sold in 2007 to a private-equity investor.

In the third quarter of 2006, the Singapore store emerged as the best performing among the group's 559 outlets, with the highest revenue generated per square meter. At one point, the highest-grossing location in US territory was a remodeled and expanded store in Puerto Rico, generating $17 million in sales annually. Another notably large and successful location in the U.S. was located at 5 World Trade Center in New York City, but the store sustained damage and was closed in the aftermath of the September 11, 2001 terrorist attacks.

On November 26, 2009, Borders (UK) Ltd was placed into administration, which is the equivalent to Chapter 11 bankruptcy protection in the United States. At that time, the Borders bookshop chain in the UK started a closing down sale in all of its 45 stores. On December 14, Borders UK converted to liquidation (which is equivalent to Chapter 7 in the US) and announced it was going out of business. All UK stores were closed by the end of the year.

By the end of 2009, all of Borders' directly owned overseas locations had been sold or closed, leaving only the franchise stores in Dubai, Oman, and Malaysia.

Franchise stores

In April 2005, Borders Group opened its first franchise store with Malaysia's Berjaya Books Sdn. Bhd. in Kuala Lumpur. Borders' second store in Malaysia is located in The Curve, Mutiara Damansara. The third Borders store opened in Queensbay Mall, Penang on December 7, 2006. Borders opened a franchise store in the Mall of the Emirates in Dubai, UAE in October 2006. Despite financial difficulties in the domestic market, Borders continued to expand its franchises, adding stores in Malaysia, Oman, and Sharjah.

Changes in business plan
In 1998, Philip Pfeffer succeeded Robert DiRomualdo as chief executive.

In 2003, Borders had 1,249 stores using the Borders and Waldenbooks names.

In 2004, Borders reached an agreement with Starbucks subsidiary Seattle's Best Coffee to operate cafes in its domestic superstores under the Seattle's Best brand name.

In March 2007, Borders Group announced it would scale down the number of Waldenbooks outlets it had by half, to about 300, in the next year.

Also in March 2007, Borders Group announced the disposal of its Ireland and UK businesses, including its Books etc. business in the UK, with the aim of revitalizing the core US business; however, it was also announced that Borders Group would retain the Paperchase stationery business. International expansion would be likely to continue via franchising.

In September 2007, it was announced that the 42 Borders and 28 Books etc. stores in Ireland and the UK had been sold to private-equity group Risk Capital Partners for an initial £20 million. However, after changing hands in 2009, Borders in Ireland and the UK went into administration on November 26, 2009. After failing to find a buyer, all the stores were shut on December 22, 2009.

In 2008, Borders opened 14 concept stores nationwide, which included a Digital Center, offering select electronic devices such as MP3 players, digital photo frames, and the Sony Reader. The concept stores were located in Ann Arbor, Michigan; Denver, Colorado; Las Vegas, Nevada; Panama City Beach, Florida; Noblesville, Indiana; Monroeville, Pennsylvania; and Alameda, California. The latest Borders Digital Center opened in Alameda in January 2008.

In late 2007, Borders installed digital video monitors in select stores. The monitors displayed special programs, as well as news, sports, and financial information provided through Ripple Networks, Inc., a California-based marketing service.

Borders Group also launched a customer appreciation program called Borders Rewards. In contrast to a membership from Barnes & Noble, which was a paid-for membership that entitled customers to discounts, Borders Rewards was a free program with discount coupons and the ability to earn store credit for purchases. In addition, in September 2009, following the lead of Barnes & Noble, the chain discontinued its fee-based wireless service provided by T-Mobile and began implementing a free Wi-Fi network provided by Verizon.

The Australian, New Zealand, and Singaporean stores were sold in June 2008 to Pacific Equity Partners (who also own local competitor Angus & Robertson), which then formed a new company, RedGroup Retail, to pay off debt.

Declining profits
The last year that Borders made a profit was in 2006. Its yearly income dropped by $1 billion over the next four years.

In March 2007, the company announced the end of its marketing alliance with Amazon begun six years earlier, as well as plans to launch its own online business in early 2008.

In March 2008, Borders Group announced the intention to sell the chain because of financial difficulties. Borders Books was rumored to have approached Barnes & Noble in hopes of a buyout. The chain was in debt, having increased its financial instability by borrowing US$42.5 million in March from Pershing Square Capital Management, the company's major stockholder, to keep the company running through the remainder of the fiscal year. The loan was said to have a very high interest rate of 12.5%, which meant that the chain would have to post a significant profit to stay afloat in the future. Following the announcement of the loan, Borders' shares dropped 28.6% to $5.07/share. The shares continued to drop throughout the year, and as of December 11, 2009, Borders stocks were trading at $1.30 on the NYSE, which was up almost a point from a low of $0.530 on January 28, 2009.

Also in 2008, Borders signed an agreement with Lulu Press to create Borders Personal Publishing. Through this, authors could self-publish their work through Borders and its website.

On January 5, 2009, the company announced that Ron Marshall would immediately take over as chief executive. Former CEO George L. Jones received a severance package of $2.09 million. Mark Bierley was also promoted to chief financial officer, replacing Ed Wilhelm. The changes in management were due to Borders' holiday sales having fallen by 11.7% to $868.8 million. On January 13, Mick McGuire, a former partner at Pershing Square, became chairman of the board of directors.

On March 30, 2009, Marshall announced that the loan from Pershing Square would be extended for another year (coming due on April 1, 2010), at an interest rate of 9.8%. This, combined with a series of layoffs and new promotional deals with major publishers, caused Borders stock to rise. Within a week, it had topped the $1.00 mark. By mid-April, it had approached $2.00. As a result, the company cancelled plans to ask its shareholders for permission to perform a reverse stock split.

On August 11, 2009, Borders revealed the names of the replacements for five of the eight members of the board of directors, who had previously announced their intentions to quit. The new members included Paul J. Brown of Hilton Hotels, Timothy V. Wolf of MillerCoors, and Dan Rose of Facebook.

On November 5, 2009, Borders announced that it would close some of its Waldenbooks stores in an effort to improve the profitability of its Specialty Retail operations. By January 2010, 182 stores had been closed.

Holiday sales figures for 2009 were "disappointing", with total sales of $846.8 million, down 14.7% from the previous year. Employees reported that major cuts were made in payroll hours.

On January 26, 2010, CEO Ron Marshall resigned to become president and CEO of The Great Atlantic & Pacific Tea Co. (A&P). Following his announcement, Borders stock fell below one dollar per share. During his tenure at Borders, all of the top executive officers resigned (or were encouraged to leave), including some who had been with the company for over 20 years. Mike Edwards (vice president and chief merchandising officer) was appointed interim CEO.

On March 31, 2010, Borders announced that the loan from Pershing Square had been paid in full. In early April, the company's stock had rebounded to $2.78 per share.

On May 21, 2010, it was revealed that Bennett S. LeBow, chairman of Vector Group, was making a large private investment in Borders stock. As a result, Howard Lorber, president and CEO of Vector Group, and he joined the board of directors. Following the resignation of chairman Mick McGuire, LeBow was elected chairman of the board. On June 3, LeBow became CEO of Borders Group. Mike Edwards was confirmed as president of Borders Group and CEO of Borders, Inc., the company's principal subsidiary.

The company reported significant losses for the third quarter, compared to 2009. At the end of 2010, Business Week and BBC News reported that Borders would be delaying its payments to publishers for inventory already received, to preserve liquidity. This was prompted by problems in refinancing its credit facilities.

Bankruptcy and liquidation

On February 16, 2011, the company announced that it had filed for Chapter 11 bankruptcy protection, listing $1.275 billion in assets and $1.293 billion in debts in its filing. The company also announced the liquidation and closing of 226 stores. Two private-equity firms, The Gores Group and Najafi Companies, expressed interest in purchasing half of the remaining Borders Group stores.

Borders Group announced on July 1, 2011, that it had found a bidder, Direct Brands, that would acquire the assets for $215 million and the assumption of $220 million in debt.

A group of Borders creditors rejected the Direct Brands takeover bid in July 2011. Borders filed for an auction and the motion was approved by a judge; however, the bid deadline expired on July 17 without a bidder. A United States bankruptcy judge approved a petition to liquidate; this resulted in the company converting their Chapter 11 case to Chapter 7. On July 22, 2011, Borders started closing its remaining 399 stores with a phased roll-out. Business operations ceased in September 2011. Former rival and the current second-largest chain of bookstores in the United States, Books-A-Million, had made a bid to acquire 30 to 35 stores and their assets on July 19, 2011, the day liquidation was approved by the courts. However, the two sides were unable to come to an agreement suitable to all parties.

Books-A-Million later resurrected its offer to buy portions of Borders Group, purchasing the leases for 21 stores primarily in New England and Pennsylvania.
Borders USA closed its remaining stores on Sunday, September 18, 2011. The last remaining Singaporean Borders store in Parkway Parade Shopping Center, closed its doors at 9 pm (Singapore time) after a final sale on Monday, September 26, 2011. However, international Borders stores are still operating in the United Arab Emirates, Oman, and Malaysia. These Borders stores are now under different ownership from the original Borders Group, and were unaffected by their store closures.

The Borders online store closed on September 27, 2011, at 10:30 pm Eastern. A banner then appeared on their website allowing users to browse, but directed them to Barnes & Noble to complete their purchases. All Borders customers had until October 29, 2011, to prevent their personal contact and purchase information from being transferred to Barnes & Noble. On October 1, 2011, Borders cardholders were informed by email: "As part of Borders ceasing operations, we Barnes & Noble acquired some of its assets including Borders brand trademarks and their customer list." The federal bankruptcy court approved this sale on September 26, 2011.

The Borders brand in Singapore was purchased by Popular Holdings in late 2012. In an attempt to revive the brand, a single Borders store opened in Westgate for a trial period in 2013, but that store was shortly after converted to a regular Popular book store.

eBook store
On July 7, 2010, Borders opened an eBook store to allow books to be directly downloaded to an e-reader device or a Borders eReader app for the desktop, iPhone, iPad, BlackBerry, or Android. Although branded as a Borders store, it was actually handled by Kobo, Inc.

On June 3, 2011, the Borders eReader apps were changed to Kobo eReader apps and users could transfer their Borders eBooks to their Kobo library.

See also

 Books in the United States
 Retail apocalypse
 List of retailers affected by the retail apocalypse

References

External links
 Official Website (Archive)

Bookstores of the United States
Defunct retail companies of the United States
Companies based in Ann Arbor, Michigan
Defunct companies based in Michigan
American companies established in 1971
Retail companies established in 1971
Retail companies disestablished in 2011
1971 establishments in Michigan
2011 disestablishments in Michigan
Bookstores established in the 20th century
Companies that have filed for Chapter 7 bankruptcy
Companies that filed for Chapter 11 bankruptcy in 2011